The Move United Junior Nationals (formerly the National Junior Disability Championships and the Adaptive Sports USA Junior Nationals) is an annual multi-sport event organized by Move United (formerly Adaptive Sports USA) for junior athletes between the ages of 6 and 22 who have disabilities, with sports including para-athletics.

Several Paralympic athletes started out as competitors at the NJDC.

The 2019 Junior Nationals were hosted from July 14–19, by Eden Prairie, Minnesota, at the Eden Prairie High School campus. The 2020 event was to be hosted in Denver, Colorado but was cancelled and deferred to 2021 due to the COVID-19 pandemic.

Events 

The event was founded in 1984 by Wheelchair & Ambulatory Sports, USA and was first held in July 1984.

Similar to the Olympic Games, the Junior Nationals are held every year in a different host city in the United States through a bidding process.

Participant Eligibility Requirements 
All participating athletes must be at least 23 years or younger to participate. In 2020 the games were canceled and deferred to 2021 due to the COVID-19 pandemic. When the Junior Nationals returned the following year 2021 the decision was made to allow athletes, 23 years of age that would have aged out of Junior Nationals in 2020 to compete.

Athletes must have a physical, visual, or intellectual impairment that is classifiable under the International Paralympic Committee’s (IPC) Classification System.

Athletes must also achieve required qualifying standards prior to the Junior Nationals registration deadline.

Qualifying Events 
List of Move United Sanctioned Competition, an NGB or High School Athletic Association sanctioned event the qualifies for the Junior Nationals that are held throughout the United States of America.

April
Texas Regional Games
GUMBO North

May
Challenge Games
Desert Challenge Games
Dixie Games
Gateway Games
Great Lakes Games
Lone Star Para Invitational
Russ Harvey Memorial Archery Tournament
Thunder In the Valley Games

June
5280 Challenge
Angle City Games
UCO Endeavor Games
Beehive Games	
Peachtree Paragames
Southeastern Regional Wheelchair Games
Turnstone Endeavor Games
Tri-State Wheelchair & Ambulatory Games

August
Adaptive Sports New England Track Meet	
Chicago Para-Archery Championship

Past host cities

References 

Archery at multi-sport events
Boccia competitions
Parasports competitions
Multi-sport events
St. Peters, Missouri
Recurring sporting events established in 1984
Swimming at multi-sport events
Table tennis at multi-sport events
Disability organizations based in the United States
Track and field competitions in the United States
Volleyball at multi-sport events
Weightlifting at multi-sport events
Wheelchair racing
Boccia in the United States
Bowling competitions in the United States
1984 establishments in the United States